Türksat 2A, a.k.a. Eurasiasat 1, was a Turkish communications satellite as part of a project to form an instant network with two geosynchronous satellites that is supervised by the companies Türksat A.Ş. in Turkey and Eurasiasat SAM in Monaco.

Türksat 2A was launched by Arianespace atop an Ariane-44P H10-3 launch vehicle on January 10, 2001, at 21:39 UTC from ELA-2 at the Guiana Space Centre in Kourou, French Guiana. The spacecraft was successfully placed into geostationary transfer orbit and then shifted to 42°E position, co-locating with Türksat 1C, which was launched in 1996. Its broadcast traffic entered service on February 1, 2001.

Turksat 2A was designed for covering Europe, Turkey on west spot and Turkey and Central Asia including Middle East and Russia on east spot so as to serve simultaneously within that region, and to provide direct connection between Europe and Central Asia. The communications payload consists of 36 Ku band transponders consisting of 22 pieces of 33 MHz fixed beam transponders and 10 transponders of 36 MHz bandwidth with two additional steerable beams.

See also

Türksat (satellite)

References

Communications satellites of Turkey
Spacecraft launched in 2001
Communications satellites in geostationary orbit
Turksat 2A
Derelict satellites orbiting Earth